Dr. Purnima Sinha (12 October 1927 – 11 July 2015) was an Indian physicist and was one of the first Bengali women to receive a doctorate in physics. She did tremendous work in the field of x-ray crystallography of clay minerals. She was raised by a progressive family in a traditional era. She was able to further her education and led a life where she was able to pursue her passion of physics and engage in an artistic activities such as singing, painting, and writing.

Early life
Purnima was born into a progressive family on 12 October 1927 as the youngest daughter of Dr. Nares Chandra Sen-Gupta who was a constitutional lawyer and a progressive writer who had written over sixty-five books and several essays in Bengali as well as in English, some of them on women's education. He believed in equal rights for men and women. She married the eminent anthropologist professor Surajit Chandra Sinha, former vice-chancellor, Visva-Bharati University who made significant contributions to understanding the process of acculturation of tribal peoples in India. Her Daughters Supurna Sinha and Sukanya Sinha are both physicists at Raman Research Institute and Indian Statistical Institute respectively. With her husband, they also started an informal school – Mela Mesha r Pathshala in Shantiniketan for tribal children.

Education and career
Purnima's early education started in Lake School for girls, in Kolkata, which was founded by her elder sister Sushama Sengupta. She then attended Asutosh College, followed by the Scottish Church College, and finally the prestigious Rajabazar Science College, University of Calcutta. She was the first woman to earn a PhD in Physics from Calcutta University, in 1956. A protégé of Professor Satyendra Nath Bose, the celebrated theoretical physicist known for his work in quantum mechanics, she set many benchmarks as a scientist while also indulging her creative talents as an artist, writer and a musician. Her own artistic interests are varied and include learning Hindustani classical music from Yamini Ganguly, and painting from the well-known painter Gopal Ghosh. She has also taken tabla lessons from Pandit Jnan Prakash Ghosh. Her other talents include sculpting and painting. Purnima's career in science spans many decades. She earned her doctorate in x-ray crystallography of clay minerals. She received her doctorate from the University of Calcutta as a student of the Rajabazar Science College in 1956–7, under the guidance of professor Satyendra Nath Bose. She has the distinction of being the first Bengali woman to receive a doctorate in physics.

At the start of joining Professor Satyendra Nath Bose, she had scoured surplus army equipment sold as scrap on the footpaths of Calcutta after the Second World War. Purnima Sinha was looking for spare parts to build the X-ray equipment she needed for her doctoral research. We must remember that X-ray techniques were being applied to unravel DNA structure on other side of the globe around 1953. Most interestingly her research was funded by Assam Oil Company (research-industry collaboration in that era was unheard of). Not only did she build it, but she also went on to study different types of clay from all over India. Later on, Dr Sinha joined the Biophysics Department at Stanford University's ‘Origin of Life’ project, which had an interface with her work. She compared the X-ray structure of clay with DNA patterns, geometrically, and was fascinated to find a connection.

Publications
She had written extensively on many subjects in both English and Bengali. She had also been a regular contributor to Jnan O Bijnan (Knowledge and Science), a scientific journal in the Bengali vernacular published by Bangiya Bijnan Parishad (Bengal Science Association), founded by Satyendra Nath Bose. Recently Bangiya Bigyan Parishad awarded and felicitated her for popularizing science in Bengali, a passion she shared with her teacher. She translated Erwin Schrödinger's Mind And Matter into Bengali in 1990. She wrote a book An Approach to the Study of Indian Music in 1970 and articles about folk music based on folk music recordings done in the field by her husband and her during anthropological field studies in the tribal regions of Purulia in West Bengal. She wrote an analytical article ‘Jarawa Songs and Vedic Chant: A Comparison of Melodic Pattern’ in The Journal of Asiatic Society in 2005 based on their field trip to the Andaman Islands in 1988.

She has written extensively on Satyendra Nath Bose and the works on him are:
Bijnan Sadhanar Dharay Satyendranath Bose, a book published by Visva Vidya Sangraha.
Amar Katha, a book published by Bangiya Bijnan Parishad.
, article published in Desh

Other interests

She enjoyed singing, painting, writing, and reading books. She had a large, rare collection of books and journals at home. At the age of 80, she continued to enjoy meeting people, conversing and reminiscing. When she joined the Central Glass and Ceramic Research Institute, Dr Sinha continued her work on clay minerals and ceramic colours. Amazingly, she also moulded the material that she studied in artistic ways and learned clay modelling. When not indulging her creative pursuits, Dr Sinha was translating science books into Bengali.

References

1927 births
Indian women physicists
Bengali physicists
Bengali Hindus
20th-century Indian physicists
Articles created or expanded during Women's History Month (India) - 2014
Asutosh College alumni
Scottish Church College alumni
University of Calcutta alumni
Indian Institute of Science alumni
Women scientists from West Bengal
X-ray crystallography
Scientists from Kolkata
20th-century Indian women scientists
2015 deaths